Lymm railway station was a station to the west of Whitbarrow Road, Lymm, England on the Warrington and Stockport Railway. It opened in 1853; and it closed in 1962. The railway was absorbed by the LNWR. The station was on the southernmost railway line between Liverpool to Manchester.

References

External links
 Lymm at Disused Stations

Disused railway stations in Warrington
Former London and North Western Railway stations
Railway stations in Great Britain opened in 1853
Railway stations in Great Britain closed in 1962